The 1954 Edinburgh East by-election was held on 8 April 1954.  It was held due to the judge appointment to the Court of Session of the incumbent Labour MP, John Thomas Wheatley.  It was retained by the Labour candidate, George Willis.

References

1954 in Scotland
1950s elections in Scotland
1954 elections in the United Kingdom
East, 1954
1950s in Edinburgh